Thunder is the sound caused by lightning. Depending upon the distance from and nature of the lightning, it can range from a long, low rumble to a sudden, loud crack. The sudden increase in temperature and hence pressure caused by the lightning produces rapid expansion of the air in the path of a lightning bolt. In turn, this expansion of air creates a sonic shock wave, often referred to as a "thunderclap" or "peal of thunder". The scientific study of thunder is known as brontology and the irrational fear (phobia) of thunder is called brontophobia.

Etymology
The d in Modern English thunder (from earlier Old English þunor) is epenthetic, and is now found as well in Modern Dutch donder (cf. Middle Dutch donre; also Old Norse þorr, Old Frisian þuner, Old High German donar, all ultimately descended from Proto-Germanic *þunraz). In Latin the term was tonare "to thunder". The name of the Nordic god Thor comes from the Old Norse word for thunder.

The shared Proto-Indo-European root is *tón-r̥ or *, also found in Gaulish Taranis.

Cause
The cause of thunder has been the subject of centuries of speculation and scientific inquiry. Early thinking was that it was made by deities, but the ancient Greek philosophers attributed it to natural causes, such as wind striking clouds (Anaximander, Aristotle) and movement of air within clouds (Democritus). The Roman philosopher Lucretius held it was from the sound of hail colliding within clouds.

In the mid 19th century, the accepted theory was that lightning produced a vacuum and that the collapse of that vacuum produced what is known as thunder.

In the 20th century a consensus evolved that thunder must begin with a shock wave in the air due to the sudden thermal expansion of the plasma in the lightning channel. This heating causes a rapid outward expansion, impacting the surrounding cooler air at a speed faster than sound would otherwise travel. The resultant outward-moving pulse is a shock wave, similar in principle to the shock wave formed by an explosion, or at the front of a supersonic aircraft. In close proximity to the source, the sound pressure level of thunder is usually 165 to 180 dB, but can exceed 200 dB in some cases.

Experimental studies of simulated lightning have produced results largely consistent with this model, though there is continued debate about the precise physical mechanisms of the process. Other causes have also been proposed, relying on electrodynamic effects of the enormous current acting on the plasma in the bolt of lightning.

Consequences
The shock wave in thunder is sufficient to cause property damage and injury, such as internal contusion, to individuals nearby. Thunder can rupture the eardrums of people nearby, leading to permanently impaired hearing. Even if not, it can lead to temporary deafness.

Types
Vavrek et al. (n.d.) reported that the sounds of thunder fall into categories based on loudness, duration, and pitch. Claps are loud sounds lasting 0.2 to 2 seconds and containing higher pitches. Peals are sounds changing in loudness and pitch. Rolls are irregular mixtures of loudness and pitches. Rumbles are less loud, last for longer (up to more than 30 seconds), and of low pitch.

Inversion thunder results when lightning strikes between cloud and ground occur during a temperature inversion; the resulting thunder sounds have significantly greater acoustic energy than from the same distance in a non-inversion condition. In an inversion, the air near the ground is cooler than the higher air; inversions often occur when warm moist air passes above a cold front. Within a temperature inversion, the sound energy is prevented from dispersing vertically as it would in a non-inversion and is thus concentrated in the near-ground layer.

Cloud-to-ground lightning (CG) typically consists of two or more return strokes, from ground to cloud. Later return strokes have greater acoustic energy than the first.

Perception 

The most noticeable aspect of lightning and thunder is that the lightning is seen before the thunder is heard. This is a consequence of the speed of light being much greater than the speed of sound.

A very bright flash of lightning and an almost simultaneous sharp "crack" of thunder, a thundercrack, therefore indicates that the lightning strike was very near.

Close-in lightning has been described first as a clicking or cloth-tearing sound, then a cannon shot sound or loud crack/snap, followed by continuous rumbling. The early sounds are from the leader parts of lightning, then the near parts of the return stroke, then the distant parts of the return stroke.

See also
 Brontophobia (fear of thunder)
 Castle Thunder sound effect
 Lightning
 List of thunder gods
 Mistpouffers
 Thunderbolt
 Thunderstorm

References

External links

 The Science of Thunder—National Lightning Safety Institute
 Thunder: A Child of Lightning by Keith C. Heidorn, PhD, ACM
 Storm: Thunder sounds in binaural audio

Lightning
Noise
Severe weather and convection
Meteorological phenomena

fi:Ukkonen
ja:雷#雷鳴
sv:Åska